John Bruce Richard O'Neill, 3rd Viscount O'Neill (30 December 1780 – 12 February 1855) was an Irish Tory politician who sat in the House of Commons from 1802 to 1841 and then in the House of Lords.

O'Neill was the son of John, Viscount O'Neill and his wife Henrietta Frances Boyle.

In 1802 O'Neill was elected Member of Parliament (MP) for Antrim. He held the seat until 1841 when he inherited the title Viscount O'Neill from his brother Charles O'Neill, 1st Earl O'Neill.

O'Neill died at the age of 74.  His title became extinct, but his estates passed to a relative, William Chichester, who subsequently assumed the surname O'Neill and received the Barony of O'Neill.

References

External links
 

1780 births
1855 deaths
UK MPs 1832–1835
UK MPs 1802–1806
UK MPs 1806–1807
UK MPs 1807–1812
UK MPs 1812–1818
UK MPs 1818–1820
UK MPs 1820–1826
UK MPs 1826–1830
UK MPs 1830–1831
UK MPs 1831–1832
UK MPs 1835–1837
UK MPs 1837–1841
UK MPs who inherited peerages
Members of the Parliament of the United Kingdom for County Antrim constituencies (1801–1922)
Viscounts in the Peerage of Ireland
O'Neill dynasty
Irish representative peers